Eduard Ritter von Dostler (1892–1917) was a German First World War fighter ace credited with 26 confirmed aerial victories. In addition to his prowess as an ace, he was entrusted with the successive command of three of the German Empire's fighter squadrons.

The victory list

The victories of Eduard Ritter von Dostler are reported in chronological order, which is not necessarily the order or dates the victories were confirmed by headquarters.

Abbreviations were expanded by the editor creating this list.

Endnotes

References

Aerial victories of Dostler, Eduard Ritter von
Dostler, Eduard Ritter von